Ardwick railway station in Ardwick, Manchester, England, is about one mile (1.5 km) south-east of Manchester Piccadilly, in an industrial area of east Manchester. Plans to close the station permanently were scrapped in 2006 due to increasing activity in the area. The station has just one train in each direction calling on Monday to Friday in the winter 2019–20 timetable. These trains have additionally called at the station on Saturdays from May 2018.

History

It was opened by the Sheffield, Ashton-Under-Lyne and Manchester Railway in 1842 and became part of the Manchester, Sheffield & Lincolnshire Railway during mergers in 1847. That company changed its name to the Great Central Railway in 1897. The station became a junction between the London, Midland & Scottish Railway and the London & North Eastern Railway under the Grouping of 1923, and passed to the London Midland Region of British Railways on nationalisation in 1948.

When sectorisation was introduced in the 1980s, the station was served by Regional Railways under arrangement with the Greater Manchester PTE until the privatisation of British Rail.

Ardwick rail depot, opened 2006 for the Class 185 DMU fleet is a short distance to the east.

From 1878 to 1902 there was also an Ardwick stop shown on Crewe–Manchester line timetables for collection of Manchester tickets on down trains.

Non-closure

In its draft Route Utilisation Strategy (RUS) for the North West, Network Rail proposed the closure of Ardwick, but the closure proposals were dropped from the final report published on 1 May 2007. Proposals to close Ardwick and two other stations in Greater Manchester were shelved after residents and passenger groups persuaded Network Rail that long-term development could improve the business case for keeping the stations open.

Ardwick is unstaffed and has a single island platform on the electrified line to Glossop and Hadfield. Access is from a footbridge, with no wheelchair access. It is immediately adjacent to the main Manchester branch of the West Coast Main Line, and the two routes join just north of the station.  It has a peak-hour-only service of one train inbound from New Mills Central to Manchester in the morning, and one train outbound to Rose Hill Marple in the evening (Monday – Saturday only). The only station from which a direct daily return to Ardwick is possible (without changing) is therefore Romiley, which is called at by both services. The lines passing through the station are all intensively used by non-stop trains and this, coupled with its location in a largely non-residential area, accounts for its infrequent service.

In 2004–2005 financial year only 285 passengers used the station, or fewer than one per day, increasing to 358 in 2005–2006. More recently, passenger numbers have increased to a little under 1000 per year, even with the skeleton service provided.

Services
On Saturdays, only the 06:37 service to Manchester Piccadilly runs. There is no service on a Sunday.

Notes

References

External links

Railway stations in Manchester
DfT Category F2 stations
Former Great Central Railway stations
Railway stations in Great Britain opened in 1842
Northern franchise railway stations
1842 establishments in England